Mohammad Massad Al-Muwallad (born 17 February 1983) is a Saudi Arabian former football player who last played as a midfielder for Al-Hilal on loan from Al Ahli. He could also play in central or right or left defense.
He is the brother of former notable player Khalid Massad.
He played for the Saudi Arabian national team and was called up to the squad to participate in the 2006 FIFA World Cup.

Achievements

Al-Ahli
Crown Prince Cup: 2002, 2007.
Saudi Federation cup: 2001, 2002.
Saudi Champions Cup: 2011, 2012.
Arab Champions League: 2003.
Gulf Club Champions Cup: 2002.

National team career statistics
2003 Gulf Cup of Nations: Champion
2006 FIFA World Cup: Group Stage
2011 AFC Asian Cup: Group Stage

References

External links
 

1983 births
Living people
Saudi Arabia international footballers
Saudi Arabian footballers
2006 FIFA World Cup players
2011 AFC Asian Cup players
Al-Ahli Saudi FC players
Al Hilal SFC players
Sportspeople from Jeddah
Association football midfielders
Saudi Professional League players